Flanders Nature Center & Land Trust is a non-profit nature center and land trust located at 5 Church Hill Road in Woodbury, Connecticut. Established in 1963, the organization holds in trust over 2,100 acres of open space in seven preserves in Woodbury, Bethel, Southbury and Middlebury.

The center offers classes in nature, art, summer camps, after-school and other programs for adults, children and school groups.

Reserves
 Van Vleck Farm and Nature Sanctuary, Woodbury, teaching campus with a farmhouse, studio, trail house, sugar house and barns
 Whittemore Sanctuary, 686 acres, Woodbury
 Manville Kettle, 6.5 acres, Woodbury
 Hetzel Refuge, 54 acres, Middlebury
 Fredrick W. Marzahl Memorial Refuge 
 Leavenworth Preserve, 126 acres, Woodbury
 Fleming Preserve, 28.5 acres, Woodbury

References

External links
 Flanders Nature Center

Nature centers in Connecticut
Land trusts in Connecticut
Woodbury, Connecticut
Tourist attractions in Litchfield County, Connecticut
Buildings and structures in Litchfield County, Connecticut
Protected areas of Litchfield County, Connecticut
Education in Litchfield County, Connecticut
1963 establishments in Connecticut